Gender norming is the practice of adjusting physical tests for men and women to in a way that ensures that they have roughly equal pass-rates for each gender.  In Bauer v. Lynch, the United States Court of Appeals for the Fourth Circuit has found that gender norming is permissible under Title VII of the Civil Rights Act of 1964, which covers employment discrimination.

In practice
The US Army adopted gender norming at West Point, calling it a system of "equivalent training". The objective is to ensure that positions are filled with a balance of both genders, and requires that women be given less physically challenging tests than men in order to attain the same fitness rating.

In Bauer v. Lynch (Decided: January 11, 2016), the United States Court of Appeals for the Fourth Circuit has found that gender norming is permissible under Title VII of the Civil Rights Act of 1964, which covers employment discrimination.

Opposition
David Brinkley, deputy chief of staff for operations at the United States Army's Training and Doctrine Command, told the AP “the men don’t want to lower the standards because they see that as a perceived risk to their team”, and “the women don’t want to lower the standards because they want the men to know they’re just as able as they are to do the same task.” Other opponents include Walter E. Williams, who wrote that "officers who insist that females be held accountable to the same high standards as males are seen by higher brass as obstructionist and risk their careers", and Elaine Donnelly, the founder of the Center for Military Readiness.

In popular culture
In the movie, G.I. Jane, the female SEAL candidate Jordan O'Neil receives an extra 30 seconds in an obstacle course and told, "It's called gender norming, O'Neil. Standard procedure for all females in physical training."

See also
 Affirmative action
 Equal opportunity
 Masculinity vs femininity
 Aggression and gender

References

Gender equality